Jakarta Special Capital Region III, abbreviated as DKI Jakarta III, is an electoral district in Indonesia which encompasses of North, West Jakarta and Thousand Islands Regency in the Jakarta Special Capital Region. Since 2019, this district has been represented by seven members of People's Representative Council (DPR RI).

Components 
 2009–present: North Jakarta, West Jakarta, and Thousand Island Regency

List of members 
The following list is in alphabetical order. Party with the largest number of members is placed on top of the list.

Notes

See also 
 List of Indonesian national electoral districts

Reference

External Links 
 (Indonesian) Daftar Anggota Dewan Perwakilan Rakyat Republik Indonesia Daerah Pemilihan DKI Jakarta III 2019–2024

Electoral districts of Indonesia